The Southern League was the amatorial football championship in Southern Italy during the 20's of the 20th century.

The 1925–26 season was organized within the Italian Football Federation. The winner had the honor to play against the Northern Champions.

The League maintained the goal to improve the quality of the game in the area. However, the League’s plan to abolish the regional tournaments was boycotted by the Roman and Apulia teams. After a year of different protests, the League collapsed under its internal tensions, and it was disbanded by the fascists which promoted three clubs to the new Divisione Nazionale white the other teams were forced into a new inter-regional championship.

Qualifications

Marche

Championship playoff 

Anconitana was declared Marche's champion. Both teams were admitted to the Southern League semifinals.

Lazio

Pre-League qualifications 

Because of the sole points were considered by the championship regulations, with no relevance to the aggregation of goals, a tie-break was needed.

Tie-break
Played on July 5, 1925, in Rome, Stadio Flaminio.

Audace Roma maintained his place in the First Division, but Roman was later admitted too.

Classification

Results table

Campania

Pre-League Qualifications 

Salernitanaudax maintained his place in the First Division, but later retired. Stabia was admitted in his place.

Classification

Results table

Apulia 
None of the Apulian teams were admitted to the National Division.

Classification

Results table

Sicily

Championship playoff 

Palermo was declared Sicily's champion. Both teams were admitted to the Southern League semifinals. None of the teams were admitted to the National Division.

Semifinals

Group A

Classification

Results table

Group B

Classification

Results table

Finals

Alba Roma qualified for the National Finals.

Footnotes

Football in Italy